The Locksmith is a 2023 American thriller film directed by Nicolas Harvard in his feature directorial debut. John Glosser, Joe Russo, Chris LaMont, and Ben Kabialis wrote the screenplay based on an original story by Blair Kroeber.

Premise 
Miller is an expert locksmith who went to prison after a job.  After getting released, he tries to start over with his daughter and ex-girlfriend, but after a kidnapping, everything changes.

Cast 
 Ryan Phillippe as Miller Graham 
 Kate Bosworth as Beth Fisher 
 Charlie Weber as Garrett Field
 Gabriela Quezada as April Reyes
 Kaylee Bryant as Tanya Saunders
 Madeleine Guilbot as Lindsay 
 Jeffrey Nordling as Ian Zwick
 Ving Rhames as Frank
 Bourke Floyd as Detective Jones
 Noel Gugliemi as Detective Perez
 George Akram as Kevin Reyes
 Livia Treviño as Sharon
 Tom Wright as Chief Stern 
 Emily Rose David as Rose

Production 
At the 2021 American Film Market, The Locksmith was revealed to be in development and seeking distribution. The original story was created by Blair Kroeber before John Glosser, Joe Russo & Chris LaMont, and Ben Kabialis developed the screenplay. The film is Nicolas Harvard's feature directorial debut. When preparing to go into production, it was announced that the film would be using rubber guns when filming after the tragic Rust shooting incident, and CGI effects would be added in post-production.

When the film was announced, Ryan Phillippe, Kate Bosworth, and Ving Rhames were cast. Filming began on November 15, 2021 in Las Cruces, New Mexico. During production additional casting announcements added Charlie Weber, Jeffrey Nordling, Kaylee Bryant. Filming was completed in February 2022.

Release
The Locksmith was released theatrically by Screen Media on February 3, 2023 and on video on demand.

Critical reception
Review aggregator website Rotten Tomatoes reported an approval rating of 35% based on 17 reviews with an average rating of 5.10 out of 10.

References

External links 
 
 
 
 

Upcoming films
American thriller films
Upcoming directorial debut films
Films shot in New Mexico